Clark Station is a neighborhood of Louisville, Kentucky located on Clark Station Road.

Neighborhoods in Louisville, Kentucky